Young Elephants FC is a Laotian professional football club based in Vientiane. They play in the Lao League 1, the top national football league in Laos. The club's players comprise about 80% of the Laos national football team.

Young Elephants FC currently consists of two teams, one in the Lao League 1 and their reserves in the Lao League 2.

Players

Technical staff

Stadium

Coaches

Honours

Lao Premier League
Champions (1): 2022
Lao FF Cup
Winners (2): 2020, 2022

Continental record

References

External links

Young Elephants Profile on the Lao League official site 
Young Elephants on Eleven Sports 
Young Elephants' Vannasone Doaungmaity interview on Eleven Sports in 2019

Football clubs in Laos